The 2016–17 Ranji Trophy was the 83rd season of the Ranji Trophy, the premier first-class cricket tournament in India. Unlike previous seasons, the 2016–17 tournament was played at neutral venues. Captains and coaches were supportive of the change. Chhattisgarh cricket team made their debut in the competition, becoming the 28th team to compete in this edition of the Ranji Trophy. Mumbai were the defending champions. Gujarat beat Mumbai in the final by 5 wickets to win their first title.

In September 2016, the Board of Control for Cricket in India (BCCI) announced the dates, groups and fixtures for the competition. The pink ball was used in the tournament, to help the BCCI make a decision on playing a day/night Test match.

In October 2016 during the Group B fixture between Maharashtra and Delhi, Swapnil Gugale and Ankit Bawne playing for Maharashtra, set a record partnership total in the Ranji Trophy, with 594 runs. It was also the second-highest partnership in the history of first-class cricket.

Two group stage fixtures, the Group A match between Gujarat and Bengal and the Group C match between Hyderabad and Tripura, were abandoned because of smog pollution. Initially, the BCCI rescheduled the fixtures to take place after the conclusion of the group stages. As a result of the rescheduled matches, the dates of the matches in the knockout phase of the competition were moved back to accommodate the rearranged fixtures. Both the Mumbai Cricket Association (MCA) and the Tamil Nadu Cricket Association (TNCA) opposed the rescheduling of the fixtures. The MCA joint-secretary Unmesh Khanvilkar said that it "gives unfair advantage to the participating teams with respect to their qualification the knockout phase". Kasi Viswanathan, secretary of the TNCA, said that "the matches should not be rescheduled and that points should be shared". The BCCI reviewed the decision to reschedule the matches. In December 2016, they revoked the changes and awarded each team one point from the abandoned matches.

Mumbai, Gujarat and Tamil Nadu from Group A, Jharkhand, Karnataka and Odisha from Group B and Hyderabad and Haryana from Group C all qualified for the knockout stage of the tournament. The dates of the quarter-finals were brought forward by one day and the semi-finals by two days. The Holkar Stadium in Indore hosted the final on 10 January 2017, two days earlier than originally planned.

In the semi-finals Gujarat beat Jharkhand by 123 runs to reach only their second final in the history of the Ranji Trophy, having previously played in the 1950–51 final. Mumbai beat Tamil Nadu by 6 wickets to progress to their 46th final in the Ranji Trophy.

Personnel changes

Players

Coaches

Teams
The teams were drawn in the following groups:

Group A
 Baroda
 Bengal
 Gujarat
 Madhya Pradesh
 Mumbai
 Punjab
 Railways
 Tamil Nadu
 Uttar Pradesh

Group B
 Assam
 Delhi
 Jharkhand
 Karnataka
 Maharashtra
 Odisha
 Rajasthan
 Saurashtra
 Vidarbha

Group C
 Andhra Pradesh
 Chhattisgarh
 Goa
 Haryana
 Himachal Pradesh
 Hyderabad
 Jammu & Kashmir
 Kerala
 Services
 Tripura

Group A

Points table

Group B

Points table

Group C

Points table

Knockout stage

Quarter-finals

Semi-finals

Final

References

External links
 Series home at ESPN Cricinfo

Ranji Trophy seasons
Ranji Trophy Trophy
Ranji Trophy
Ranji Trophy